The priestly crown or frontlet (צִיץ ṣîṣ/tsiyts) was the golden plate or tiara worn by the Jewish High Priest on his mitre or turban whenever he would minister in the Tabernacle or the Temple in Jerusalem.

Etymology
The root tzitz (צִיץ) means “to blossom” or “a flower” and as such is employed by the picturesque metaphors in Isaiah 27:6, 28:1, 40:7-8, floral descriptions of Solomon’s temple (1 Kings 6:18-35) and the blooming of Aaron’s rod (Num. 17:23). This latter instance is particularly interesting, because just as a tzitz appeared on the Aaron’s rod so is the Aaronide high-priest supposed to wear a tzitz on his forehead.  In addition to this, once in the Hebrew Bible, in Ezekiel 8:3, the word appears in the construction tzitzit rosh meaning “a mop of hair” and probably deriving from the metaphor of hair as the plants grown from skin.  This is furthermore supported by a handful of rabbinic descriptions which compare the priestly tzitz  to a flower in Shabbat 63b and Sukkah 5a.

The Greek Septuagint renders the word in Exodus 28:36 and elsewhere petalos (πέταλος), "blossom," from which the English "petal" derives.

Hebrew Bible
The commandment regarding the crown is found in :

36 And thou shalt make a plate of pure gold, and engrave upon it, like the engravings of a signet: HOLY TO THE LORD. 37  And thou shalt put it on a thread of blue, and it shall be upon the mitre; upon the forefront of the mitre it shall be. 38 And it shall be upon Aaron's forehead, and Aaron shall bear the iniquity committed in the holy things, which the children of Israel shall hallow, even in all their holy gifts; and it shall be always upon his forehead, that they may be accepted before the LORD.

The Tzitz was a small rectangular plate of solid gold, engraved in Hebrew letters with "HOLINESS TO THE LORD," and having holes drilled in each of the four corners through which blue cords were threaded which held the tiara onto the High Priest's priestly turban. Traditionally, it is understood that one set of cords went around the High Priest's head at the base of the tiara, and the other went over the forehead, all meeting at the back of the head to hold the tiara in place.

 refers to the tziytz as the "holy crown".

Talmud
According to the Talmud, the wearing of the golden frontlet atoned for the sin of arrogance on the part of the Children of Israel (B.Zevachim 88b) and she also symbolizes that the high priest bears the lack of all the offerings and gifts of the sons of Israel. And it must be constantly on his head for the good pleasure of God towards them.

The Talmud in Shabbat 63b describes the tziytz as encircling the High Priest's forehead “from one ear to the other.” Rabbi Abraham Isaac Kook suggested that this emphasis on the High Priest's ears — organs for listening — indicates that he needed to be particularly "receptive to the inner voice of elevated thought."

See also
Tetzaveh, 20th weekly Torah portion (parshah) 
Priestly undergarments
Priestly tunic
Priestly sash
Priestly turban
Priestly robe (Judaism)
Ephod
Priestly breastplate

References

External links
The Crown copy of the Tzitz made by The Temple Institute in Jerusalem

Jewish religious clothing
Hebrew Bible words and phrases
Headplate